Le Voyage en douce is a 1980 French drama film directed by Michel Deville. The screenplay is shaped around 15 different sexual anecdotes, penned by 15 writers. The film stars Dominique Sanda and Geraldine Chaplin. It was entered into the 30th Berlin International Film Festival.

Plot
Disillusioned with the men in their lives, two friends, Hélène (Sanda) and Lucie (Chaplin) embark on a journey together to the South of France. As the pair continue to travel they recount their sexual histories, and repeat some of them along the journey.

Cast
 Dominique Sanda as Hélène
 Geraldine Chaplin as Lucie
 Jacques Zabor as Denis
 Jean Crubelier as L'homme des maisons
 Valerie Masterson as La cantatrice
 Cécile Le Bailly as Marie
 Jacqueline Parent as Mathilde
 Jacques Pieiller as Pinson
 Liliane Rovère as The Voice
 Françoise Morhange as La grand-mère
 Frédéric Andréi as Le jeune homme de l'hôtel
 Christophe Malavoy as L'homme du train
 André Marcon as L'homme du concert

Reception
Janet Maslin of The New York Times praised the ambiguous nature of Hélène and Lucie's relationship; "its teasing is effective, thanks particularly to Miss Sanda, who is as beautiful and insolently alluring here as she has ever been. With timing that is constantly surprising, with a knowing sensuality just this side of brazeness, Miss Sanda is enough reason to see the movie. And she and Miss Chaplin share an abandon that is intricately balanced, and gracefully played." Maslin felt that the film was "finally aimless" but that it was still "seductive all the same."

References

External links

1980 films
1980 drama films
1980 LGBT-related films
1980s French-language films
French LGBT-related films
Lesbian-related films
Films directed by Michel Deville
Gaumont Film Company films
LGBT-related drama films
1980s French films